Samuel Hays was an American politician. He served as the State Treasurer of Missouri from 1871 to 1873.

References

Year of birth missing
1897 deaths
State treasurers of Missouri
19th-century American politicians
Missouri Republicans